Everything Leads Back to You is a studio album by Slim Whitman, released in 1971 on United Artists Records.

Track listing 
The album was issued in the United States by United Artists Records as a 12-inch long-playing record, catalog number UA-LA513-G.

Charts

References 

1975 albums
Slim Whitman albums
United Artists Records albums
Albums produced by Pete Drake